USS Nestor (ARB-6) was planned as a United States Navy , but was redesignated as one of twelve Aristaeus-class battle damage repair ships built for the United States Navy during World War II. Named for Nestor (in Greek mythology, the son of Neleus, the King of Pylos and Chloris), she was the only US Naval vessel to bear the name.

Construction
Laid down as LST-518 on 13 September 1943, by the Chicago Bridge and Iron Company of Seneca, Illinois; launched 20 January 1944; sponsored by Miss Rita Jenkins; converted by the Maryland Drydock Company of Baltimore, Maryland; and commissioned 24 June 1944.

Service history
Designed to make emergency repairs in forward areas to battle-damaged ships, Nestor left Norfolk 4 August 1944, for Guantanamo Bay, the Panama Canal, and Ulithi, arriving 21 October, to take up her primary mission. During the next five and a half months she acted as tender to small craft and repaired all types of naval vessels from battleships to LCIs.
 
Nestor left Ulithi 19 April 1945, for Kerama Retto, seized in the initial phase of the Okinawa campaign at Naval Base Okinawa, to serve as a base for the ships engaged in the main assault. Japanese air attacks, often by suicide plane, inflicted heavy damage on the fleet, and Nestor worked round-the-clock, often under fire herself, to help keep the fighting ships in action. As Okinawa itself became secure, Nestor entered Buckner Bay 10 July, and continued her vital services, which here included the tremendous task of building a cofferdam. Nestor was driven aground by wind and heavy seas in the devastating Typhoon "Louise" of 9 October, and had to be abandoned. She decommissioned on 29 November, was stricken on 3 January 1946, and her hulk was sold for scrap on 1 May 1947.

In November 1945 the CNO directed that the hulk be sunk or destroyed, but this was not done and she became one of around 15 Okinawa typhoon wrecks that were finally sold for scrap in two batches in May and November 1947 by the State Department's Foreign Liquidations Commission. The date of her scrapping is not known.

Awards
Nestor earned one battle stars for World War II service.

Notes

Citations

Bibliography 

Online resources

External links
 

 

Aristaeus-class repair ships
Aristaeus-class repair ships converted from LST-491-class ships
Ships built in Seneca, Illinois
1943 ships
World War II auxiliary ships of the United States
Maritime incidents in October 1945
Shipwrecks in the Pacific Ocean